Frédéric Mion (born 30 August 1969) is a French civil servant, and former director of Sciences Po. Formerly, he was Secretary-General of Canal+.

Biography

Education 
Student at the lycée du Mas de Tesse in Montpellier, where he was awarded the French Baccalauréat, Mion went on to classes préparatoires at the Lycée Henri-IV, before integrating the École normale supérieure from which he graduated in 1988. Frédéric Mion then studied Public Affairs at Sciences Po, earning a Master's degree in 1992. After a brief period at Princeton University, he joined the École nationale d'administration (ENA), from which he graduated first in his class of the promotion Victor-Schœlcher in 1996.

Office 
In January 2021, it was revealed he knew about child abuse for 2 years before it was published in a book that brought it to international attention. In February 2021, in light of new details emerging from the Duhamel affair, Mion resigned as Director of Sciences Po.

References

1969 births
Living people
People from Montpellier
Lycée Henri-IV alumni
École Normale Supérieure alumni
Sciences Po alumni
École nationale d'administration alumni
Princeton University alumni
French academic administrators
Members of the Conseil d'État (France)